De Vlaeminck is a surname. Notable people with the surname include:

 Erik De Vlaeminck (1945–2015), Belgian cyclist
 Roger De Vlaeminck (born 1947), Belgian cyclist, brother of Erik

See also
 Tayla Vlaeminck (born 1998), Australian cricketer

Dutch-language surnames